Helsingin Sanomat Literature Prize (Finnish: Helsingin Sanomain kirjallisuuspalkinto) is a Finnish literary award for a debut novel in the Finnish language. It was founded in 1964. From 1964-1994 it operated under the name J. H. Erkko Award (Finnish: J. H. Erkon palkinto). Beginning in 1995 the name changed to Helsingin Sanomat Literature Prize.

Helsingin Sanomat Literature Prize

 1995 Sari Mikkonen: Naistenpyörä, 
 1996 Juha K. Tapio: Frankensteinin muistikirja, 
 1997 Marja Kyllönen: Lyijyuuma, 
 1998 Katri Tapola: Kalpeat tytöt, 
 1999 Jyrki Vainonen: Tutkimusmatkailija ja muita tarinoita, 
 2000 Olli Heikkonen: Jakutian aurinko, 
 2001 Reidar Palmgren: Jalat edellä, 
 2002 Reko Lundán: Ilman suuria suruja, 
 2003 Riku Korhonen: Kahden ja yhden yön tarinoita, 
 2004 Sanna Karlström: Taivaan mittakaava, 
 2005 Juhani Känkänen: Toivon mukaan, 
 2006 Armas Alvari: Varmat tapaukset, 
 2007 Henriikka Tavi: Esim. Esa, 
 2008 Katri Lipson: Kosmonautti, 
 2009 Leena Parkkinen: Sinun jälkeesi, Max, 
 2010 Alexandra Salmela: 27 eli kuolema tekee taiteilijan, 
 2011 Satu Taskinen: Täydellinen paisti,  
 2012 Aki Ollikainen: Nälkävuosi, 
 2013 Erkka Filander: Heräämisen valkea myrsky
 2014 Pajtim Statovci: Kissani Jugoslavia (My Cat Yugoslavia)
 2015 Saara Turunen: Rakkaudenhirviö
 2016 Hanna Weselius: Alma!

J. H. Erkko Award

References

Finnish literary awards
Awards established in 1995
First book awards